Quessoy is a commune in the Côtes-d'Armor department of Brittany in north-western France.

Population

Inhabitants of Quessoy are called quessoyais in French.

See also
Communes of the Côtes-d'Armor department
Élie Le Goff. Sculptor of Quessoy war memorial

References

External links

Official website 

Communes of Côtes-d'Armor